The Wicked Lady is a 1945 British costume drama film directed by Leslie Arliss and starring Margaret Lockwood in the title role as a nobleman's wife who becomes a highwayman for the excitement. The film had one of the top audiences for a film of its period, 18.4 million.

It was one of the Gainsborough melodramas, a sequence of very popular films made during the 1940s. In 2020, Filmink magazine said "if you only see one Gainsborough melodrama, this is the one to check out."

The story was based on the 1945 novel Life and Death of the Wicked Lady Skelton by Magdalen King-Hall which, in turn, was based upon the (disputed) events surrounding the life of Lady Katherine Ferrers, the wife of the major landowner in Markyate on the main London–Birmingham road.

The film was loosely remade by Michael Winner as The Wicked Lady in 1983.

Plot
Caroline (Patricia Roc) invites her beautiful, green-eyed friend Barbara (Margaret Lockwood) to her wedding to wealthy landowner and local magistrate Sir Ralph Skelton (Griffith Jones). The scheming Barbara soon has Sir Ralph entranced. Caroline, wishing his happiness, stands aside, and even allows Barbara to persuade her to be her maid of honour so as to lessen the scandal of the abrupt change of brides. At the wedding reception, Barbara meets a handsome stranger, Kit Locksby (Michael Rennie). It is love at first sight for both, but too late.

Married life in the country does not provide the new Lady Skelton with the excitement she craves. A visit from her detested sister-in-law Henrietta, Lady Kingsclere (Enid Stamp-Taylor), and her husband (Francis Lister) does not lessen her boredom. In a game of Ombre, Henrietta wins Barbara's jewels, including her most-prized possession, her late mother's ruby brooch. A chance remark about the notorious highwayman Captain Jerry Jackson gives Barbara an idea. Masquerading as Jackson, Barbara stops Henrietta's coach and retrieves her brooch (as well as the rest of Henrietta's jewellery).

Intoxicated by the experience, she continues to waylay coaches until one night, she and the real Captain Jackson (James Mason) target the same one. After they relieve the passengers of their valuables and escape, Jackson is amused to find his competitor is a beautiful woman. They become lovers and partners in crime. She warns him never to be unfaithful to her with another woman.

Barbara learns of a planned gold shipment from a former tenant farmer of Skelton's, Ned Cotterill (Emrys Jones), who will be one of the guards. Jackson is against the idea of hijacking the gold, as the coach will have double the usual protection, but Barbara talks him into it. The robbery does not go smoothly. When Cotterill pursues them, Barbara shoots at his horse and kills Cotterill by accident. Her conscience is not disturbed for long.

Hogarth (Felix Aylmer), an aged family servant, discovers Barbara's double life. However, his religious fervour to save her and her convincing lies about repenting keep him from revealing what he knows. Barbara tries to silence him for good with doses of poison. When he realizes it, she smothers him.

Barbara runs to Jackson after an absence of many months, and finds him in bed with a woman. Infuriated, she betrays him to her husband, anonymously. Jackson is captured and sentenced to be hanged. In London, Barbara goes to view the execution with Caroline, terrified that he will name her as his accomplice in his address from the scaffold. However, he only talks of faithless women. When a riot breaks out afterward, the two ladies are rescued by none other than Kit, who turns out to be engaged to Caroline.

Jackson's accomplices cut him down and revive him. He breaks into Barbara's bedroom at the Skelton estate and rapes her. Fearful of what he may do next, she begs Kit to take her out of England to start a new life. He is tempted but decides to honour his obligation to Caroline. Barbara  awaits her husband's coach with a loaded pistol. Jackson shows up to claim partnership in the caper, but when he learns what Barbara intends, it is too much even for him. He plans to warn Skelton, but Barbara shoots and kills him. When the coach with Caroline, Ralph and Kit arrives, she hijacks it and attempts to shoot her husband—not knowing that the three of them have agreed to find a way for both couples to be together. Kit shoots her first and she escapes on horseback.

Mortally wounded, Barbara flees to her home, where Caroline finds her and learns the truth. Caroline sends Kit in alone to see the dying woman. At first, Barbara lies about how she was shot; however, she cannot continue the deceit with her one true love. She confesses all and pleads with Kit to stay with her until the end, but he is repulsed by the magnitude of her crimes and leaves her to die alone. After her death, Caroline and Ralph reunite, determined to put the past behind them and live happily together.

Cast
Margaret Lockwood as Barbara Worth
James Mason as Captain Jerry Jackson
Patricia Roc as Caroline
Griffith Jones as Sir Ralph Skelton
Michael Rennie as Kit Locksby
Felix Aylmer as Hogarth
Enid Stamp Taylor as Lady Kingsclere
Francis Lister as Lord Kingsclere
Beatrice Varley as Aunt Moll
Amy Dalby as Aunt Doll
Martita Hunt as Cousin Agatha
David Horne as Martin Worth
Emrys Jones as Ned Cotterill
Helen Goss as Mistress Betsy
Muriel Aked as Mrs. Munce

Production
Magdalen King-Hall's Life and Death of the Wicked Lady Skelton was published in 1944. Mason, Lockwood and Arliss' involvement in the movie adaptation was announced in November of that year.

In a 1945 issue of Picturegoer, Arliss said that it was Eleanor Smith (author of the book which had inspired his 1943 hit The Man in Grey) who gave him King-Hall's novel. He went on to say:I told Maurice Ostrer of Gainsborough Pictures that I had found my ideal film subject and found that he had already purchased the rights himself! The character of Barbara is wicked enough even for me, and how vastly interesting is this most complex character as it develops through the action of the story.Lockwood later wrote in her memoirs, "This was an enchantingly 'wicked' part. At first, as usual, I did not like the thought of playing a villainous role again, but it was such a good one that I knew it would be madness to refuse it."

Stewart Granger turned down the role that Mason played. Lockwood practiced riding for the role and added a black beauty spot.

Caroline, the character played by Roc, is a movie script addition, not existing in the novel.

Shooting
Filming started March 1945.

The film was made at Gainsborough Studios in London with location shooting at Blickling Hall in Norfolk.

Lockwood wrote "we enjoyed making that film together. We did not enjoy remaking it, exactly one year later" when they had to re shoot scenes for American censors.

British reception
The Wicked Lady was the most popular film at the British box office in 1946. According to Kinematograph Weekly the "biggest winner" at the box office in 1946 Britain was The Wicked Lady, with "runners up" being The Bells of St Marys, Piccadilly Incident, The Road to Utopia, Tomorrow is Forever, Brief Encounter, Wonder Man, Anchors Away, Kitty, The Captive Heart, The Corn is Green, Spanish Main, Leave Her to Heaven, Gilda, Caravan, Mildred Pierce, Blue Dahlia, Years Between, O.S.S., Spellbound, Courage of Lassie, My Reputation, London Town, Caesar and Cleopatra, Meet the Navy, Men of Two Worlds, Theirs is the Glory, The Overlanders, and Bedelia.

US release
Problems with American censors made extensive re-shooting necessary before the film was released in the United States (according to Robert Osborne of Turner Classic Movies).

The problems were that the women's dress bodices (appropriate for the era portrayed) were very low-cut and showed too much cleavage for the USA motion picture production code. It was a problem Jane Russell had in The Outlaw (1943). TCM sometimes airs the original, uncensored version on its USA basic cable network.

Margaret Lockwood said "We had to do nine days of retakes to satisfy the censor on that film and it all seemed very foolish."

Mason said "I don't like it now", referring to the film after the changes.

Proposed sequel
Maurice Ostrer reportedly wanted to make a sequel but this was vetoed by J. Arthur Rank who had taken over ownership of Gainsborough studios.

In 1950 it was announced Arliss had written a sequel, The Wicked Lady's Daughter but it was never made.

References

External links

The Wicked Lady at BFI Screenonline

Review of film at Variety
The Wicked Lady (1945) at Silver Sirens
The Wicked Lady at Britmovie
Life and Death of the Wicked Lady Skelton at University of Hertfordshire Press

1945 films
1940s historical adventure films
British historical adventure films
British black-and-white films
British swashbuckler films
Films based on British novels
Films set in the 17th century
Films set in country houses
Melodrama films
Gainsborough Pictures films
Films directed by Leslie Arliss
Films about highwaymen
1940s English-language films
1940s British films